Oneindia.com is an Indian website established in January 2006 by BG Mahesh. The website provides news updates, information on sports, events, travel, entertainment, business, lifestyle, videos, and classifieds in seven different Indian languages and English. In June 2021, its Alexa ranking in India is 134. It is owned by Greynium Information Technologies Pvt Ltd.

It is available in Kannada, Hindi, Telugu, Tamil, Bengali, Gujarati, and Malayalam.

References

External links
 

Indian entertainment websites
Multilingual websites